The name Adeline has been used for two tropical cyclones in the Australian basin.

Tropical Cyclone Adeline (1973), which formed in the Gulf of Carpentaria and made landfall in the easternmost part of the Northern Territory
Cyclone Adeline-Juliet (2005), which formed near the Cocos Islands and churned in the open ocean; renamed when it moved west of 90°E.

Australian region cyclone set index articles